Shajiabang (Chinese: 沙家浜, also Shachiapang); first produced under the title Sparks Amid the Reeds, is a Chinese revolutionary opera and one of the eight "model plays" permitted during the Cultural Revolution.

Production

It was first produced as a Shanghai opera entitled Sparks amid the Reeds (芦荡火种) or Emerald Water and Red Flags in 1958 by the Hu Opera Troupe. In October 1963, the First Peking Opera Company adapted it as a Peking opera. Mao Zedong saw it in 1964 and asked that the title be changed, as sparks would not set wet reeds alight, so it was named after its setting, the town of Shajiabang ("sands family creek"). Jiang Qing (Mao's wife, a leading figure in the Cultural Revolution), insisted that the role of the Red Army political commissar be expanded. The dance routines were also revised, the opera not reaching its final form until 1970. Wang Zengqi also contributed to it.

Synopsis
Set during the Second Sino-Japanese War ("War of Resistance", early 1940s) in Japanese-ruled territory west of Shanghai. Shajiabang is a town by Yangcheng Lake. Sister Aqing runs a teahouse visited by officers of a Chinese collaborationist group; unbeknownst to them, she is a member of the Chinese Communist Party, and is helping wounded soldiers of the New Fourth Army who are hiding in the marshes.

Legacy
Shajiabang was made into a film in 1971 by the Changchun Film Studio, and the score has also been performed as a "revolutionary symphony."

An exhibition hall of Shajiabang's revolutionary history was opened in 1988, and expanded in 2006.

References

External links

Revolutionary operas
Jiangsu in fiction
Works about the Second Sino-Japanese War
Chinese plays adapted into films